= Andrew Jonathan Hillman =

Andrew Jonathan Hillman is an American biotech investor, and philanthropist based in Dallas, Texas. He is the principal of Hillman Ventures, a private family office established in 1995 that invests in frontier biotech focused on inflammation, damaged tissue regeneration, and oncology.

== Career ==
Hillman has spent more than three decades in FDA-regulated healthcare ventures. His work concentrates on the regulatory pathway analysis distinguishing 351(a) biologic license applications from 361 human cell and tissue products under 21 CFR 1271. Through Hillman Ventures he supports companies developing exosome biologics, targeted cancer therapeutics, and minimally invasive procedure platforms.

== Litigation ==
Hillman was the plaintiff in Hillman v. Ringleader Digital, a civil matter related to digital advertising practices. He has served as an expert witness in healthcare compliance and regulatory matters.

== Philanthropy ==
Hillman founded the Andrew Hillman Scholarship for Entrepreneurs and the Andrew Hillman Grant for Biotech, both directed at early-stage founders in Dallas and at programs at Southern Methodist University. He is the donor of the Andrew Hillman Family Room at the Lamplighter School, a private independent school founded in 1953 on Inwood Road in Dallas.

His support for the Lyle School of Engineering at SMU is documented in the published SMU Maker Education Project case study titled A Transformative Partnership.

== Selected writings ==
Through The Hillman Letter on Substack, Hillman publishes essays on FDA regulatory strategy, biotech investment thesis, and capital allocation discipline at family offices.
